The Deputy Leader of the Labour Party is the second highest ranking politician in the British Labour Party. The Deputy Leader also serves as the Deputy Chairperson of the Labour Party, and acts as Leader in the House in the event that the Leader cannot.

History 
The Labour Leader does not have the power to appoint or dismiss their Deputy. The post is instead directly elected by party members, registered supporters and affiliated supporters on a one-member-one-vote basis; before 2015, it was elected using the party's former electoral college system; and before 1981, it was elected by Labour MPs.

Recently, the office of Deputy Prime Minister has been revived and held by senior politicians in the governing party. A previous Labour Deputy Leader, John Prescott, held this post from 1997 to 2007. However, the Deputy Leader is essentially a party official and there is no constitutional link between the two roles. The former Labour British Prime Minister, Gordon Brown, announced on his formal election as Labour Leader that the newly elected Deputy Leader, Harriet Harman, would instead become Party Chair. Brown subsequently appointed her Leader of the House of Commons in his first cabinet.

In the event of a vacancy in the office of Leader when the Labour Party is in opposition, the Deputy Leader automatically becomes temporary Leader of the Party until a new leader is elected. If a vacancy in the leadership occurs while the Labour Party is in government, then the Cabinet, in consultation with the National Executive Committee of the Labour Party, chooses a new leader, who serves until a new Leader is elected. Such a vacancy has occurred only twice, when Harold Wilson resigned as Leader and Prime Minister in 1976, and when Tony Blair did so in 2007, but each remained in office until, respectively, James Callaghan and Gordon Brown had been elected as successor, and so no Acting Leader was required to take over.

To date, the only Deputy Leaders who have gone on to be elected Leader of the Labour Party are Clement Attlee and Michael Foot. Margaret Beckett briefly served as Labour Leader following the unexpected death of John Smith in 1994. Harriet Harman was Leader after Gordon Brown resigned in 2010 and after Ed Miliband resigned in 2015. Conversely, John Robert Clynes served as Leader prior to becoming Deputy Leader.

List of deputy leaders of the Labour Party

See also
 Deputy Leader of the Conservative Party (UK)
 Deputy Leader of the Liberal Democrats

References

 
Labour Party (UK)-related lists